Good News Mission (GNM) is a South Korean Christian-based new religious movement founded in 1971 by pastor Ock Soo Park.  It is one of several new religious movements in Korea referred to as Guwonpa (Salvation sect).

History 
The first Good News church was established in 1972 by Ock Soo Park and became a mission when the missionary school was established in 1976. In the early years, Park conducted vocation Bible schools for the youth in the nearby villages, served as a spiritual counselor at Suwon Prison, and went on witness trips to leper colonies. In the early 1990s, the mission sent its first missionaries to Germany and the United States. Missionaries sent to Kenya in the mid-1990s faced problems with religious registration as foreign groups were denied such registration unless sponsored by a native Kenyan church. Eventually, religious registration was granted to them. In the early 2000s, missionaries were dispatched to South Africa, Brazil, Czech Republic, Dominican Republic, Turkey, and Uzbekistan.

According to the church webpage, it currently has 170 churches in South Korea and 838 international churches.

Activities 
The organization's activities include religious seminars and missionary activities in different countries. It also organizes youth events, and broadcasts sermons over the radio and the internet.

Controversy 
In 2011, 400 volunteer English teachers, including a number of young college students, were led to believe that they were recruited to teach English in Mexico. The preparatory meeting, called "English Camp", included religious lectures on the topic of sin, which took place in ballrooms guarded by security personnel that discouraged members from leaving. Participants who were considered "tardy" were subjected to physical punishment such as being made to do squat-thrust exercises. One of the college students attending the event said, "I was the victim of a scam."

The organisation's activities in Nagaland, India, as well as in Uganda where religious material from the Good News Mission has been used in public schools, have also been questioned.

References

External links 

 

Christian new religious movements